Alpha Telescopii, Latinized from α Telescopii, is the brightest star in the southern constellation of Telescopium, with an apparent visual magnitude of 3.5. The ancient Roman astronomer Ptolemy included it in the constellation Corona Australis, but it was moved to Telescopium when that constellation was created by French astronomer Nicolas Louis de Lacaille in the 18th century. At that range, the visual magnitude of the star is diminished by an extinction of 0.22 due to interstellar dust.

Properties

Physical Characteristics 
This star is much larger than the Sun, with an estimated  times the mass and  times the radius. The spectrum of the star matches a stellar classification of B3 IV, where the luminosity class of 'IV' indicates this is a subgiant star that has nearly exhausted the supply of hydrogen at its core and is evolving away from the main sequence. Alpha Telescopii is a bright star that is radiating nearly 800 times the Sun's luminosity. This energy is being emitted from the star's outer envelope at an effective temperature of around 16,700 K, giving it the characteristic blue-white hue of a B-type star.

Variability 
This is possibly a type of variable star known as a slowly pulsating B-type star. A projected stellar rotation velocity of about 14 km s−1 is considered low for a star of this type, which may indicate it is being viewed from nearly pole-on.

References 

 

Telescopii, Alpha
Telescopium (constellation)
B-type subgiants
090422
CD-46 12379
6897
169467
Slowly pulsating B stars